Earl Temple of Stowe, in the County of Buckingham, is a title in the Peerage of the United Kingdom. It was created in 1822 for Richard Temple-Nugent-Brydges-Chandos-Grenville, 2nd Marquess of Buckingham, who was created Marquess of Chandos and Duke of Buckingham and Chandos at the same time. In contrast to the Marquessate and Dukedom, which were created with remainder to the heirs male of his body only, the Earldom was created with remainder to (1) the heirs male of his body, failing which to (2) the heirs male of his deceased great-grandmother the 1st Countess Temple, failing which to (3) his granddaughter Lady Anna Grenville (daughter of Richard, Earl Temple, later 2nd Duke of Buckingham and Chandos) and the heirs male of her body, and then to possible younger daughters of Lord Temple and the heirs male of their bodies (there were, in the event, no other daughters).

The Earldom remained merged with the Dukedom until the death of the 1st Duke's grandson the 3rd Duke, when the Dukedom and four of its subsidiary titles became extinct (the Viscountcy and Barony of Cobham and the Lordship of Kinloss survived, however; see these titles for more information). The late Duke was succeeded in the Earldom of Temple of Stowe according to the special remainder by his nephew William Gore-Langton. He was the eldest son of the aforementioned Lady Anna Grenville and her husband William Gore-Langton. The latter was a descendant of Sir John Gore, Lord Mayor of London in 1624, whose elder brother Sir Paul Gore, 1st Baronet, was the ancestor of the Earls of Arran (1762 creation), the Barons Annaly (1766 and 1789 creations) and the Barons Harlech.

The 4th Earl Temple of Stowe had previously represented Mid Somerset in Parliament as a Conservative. In 1892 he assumed by Royal licence the additional surname of Temple. He was succeeded by his eldest son, the 5th Earl. He died childless and was succeeded by his nephew, the 6th Earl. He was the eldest son of Captain the Hon. Chandos Temple-Gore-Langton, second son of the 4th Earl. Chandos had two daughters. On his death the title passed to his younger brother, the 7th Earl. He was a travelling salesman in Australia and did not use the title. He never married and was succeeded by his cousin, the 8th Earl. He was the son of the Hon. Evelyn Arthur Grenville Temple-Gore-Langton, third and youngest son of the fourth Earl. Upon his death in 2013, he was succeeded by his son James. Lord Temple of Stowe is also in remainder to the Lordship of Kinloss.

There are no subsidiary titles held by the Earl. Consequently, the eldest son and heir of the Earl uses the invented title Lord Langton as a courtesy title.

The family seat from which the title derives was Stowe House in Buckinghamshire.

Earls Temple of Stowe (1822)
Richard Temple-Nugent-Brydges-Chandos-Grenville, 1st Duke of Buckingham and Chandos, 1st Earl Temple of Stowe (1776–1839)
Richard Plantagenet Temple-Nugent-Brydges-Chandos-Grenville, 2nd Duke of Buckingham and Chandos, 2nd Earl Temple of Stowe (1797–1861)
Richard Plantagenet Campbell Temple-Nugent-Brydges-Chandos-Grenville, 3rd Duke of Buckingham and Chandos, 3rd Earl Temple of Stowe (1823–1889)
William Stephen Temple-Gore-Langton, 4th Earl Temple of Stowe (1847–1902)
Algernon William Stephen Temple-Gore-Langton, 5th Earl Temple of Stowe (1871–1940)
Chandos Grenville Temple-Gore-Langton, 6th Earl Temple of Stowe (1909–1966)
(Ronald) Stephen Brydges Temple-Gore-Langton, 7th Earl Temple of Stowe (1910–1988)
(Walter) Grenville Algernon Temple-Gore-Langton, 8th Earl Temple of Stowe (1924–2013)
James Grenville Temple-Gore-Langton, 9th Earl Temple of Stowe (born 1955)

Present peer
James Grenville Temple-Gore-Langton, 9th Earl Temple of Stowe (born 1955) is the elder son of the 8th Earl. In 2008 he married Julie Christine Mainwaring, daughter of Alan Mainwaring, of Brampton, Cumbria, and they have two children:
Rowan Caradoc Temple (born 1987), not in succession to the peerages
Lady Jenny Megan Temple (born 1990)
 
The heir presumptive is the present holder's brother, the Hon. Robert Chandos Grenville Temple-Gore-Langton (born 1957), whose heir apparent is his son, Louis Grenville Gore-Langton (born 1990).

Line of succession

  Richard Temple-Nugent-Brydges-Chandos-Grenville, 1st Duke of Buckingham and Chandos, 1st Earl Temple of Stowe (1776–1839)
  Richard Plantagenet Temple-Nugent-Brudges-Chandos-Grenville, 2nd Duke of Buckingham and Chandos, 2nd Earl Temple of Stowe (1797–1861)
  Richard Plantagenet Campbell Temple-Nugent-Brydges-Chandos-Grenville, 3rd Duke of Buckingham and Chandos, 3rd Earl Temple of Stowe (1823–1889)
 Lady Anna Eliza Mary Temple-Nugent-Brydges-Chandos-Grenville (d. 1879)
  William Stephen Temple-Gore-Langton, 4th Earl Temple of Stowe (1847–1902)
  Algernon William Stephen Temple-Gore-Langton, 5th Earl Temple of Stowe (1871–1940)
 Captain Hon. Chandos Graham Temple-Gore-Langton (1873–1921)
  Chandos Grenville Temple-Gore-Langton, 6th Earl Temple of Stowe (1909–1966)
  Ronald Stephen Brydges Temple-Gore-Langton, 7th Earl Temple of Stowe (1910–1988)
 Lt-Cdr Hon. Evelyn Arthur Grenville Temple-Gore-Langton (1884–1972)
  Walter Grenville Algernon Temple-Gore-Langton, 8th Earl Temple of Stowe (1924–2013)
  James Grenville Temple-Gore-Langton, 9th Earl Temple of Stowe (born 1955)
 Rowan Caradoc Temple-Gore-Langton (b. 1987; born before his parents' marriage and therefore not included in the line of succession)
 (1) Hon. Robert Chandos Temple-Gore-Langton (b. 1957)
 (2) Louis Grenville Temple-Gore-Langton (b. 1990)
 (3) Christopher Chandos Temple-Gore-Langton (b. 1993)
 Hon. Henry Powell Gore-Langton (1854–1913)
 Commander Hubert Edwin Gore-Langton (1883–1968)
 Lt-Cdr. Alaric Hubert St. George Gore-Langton (1918–1987)
 (4) Chandos Alaric Graham Gore Langton (b. 1949)
 (5) Chandos James Brydges Gore Langton (b. 1987)
 (6) Grenville Julian Brydges Gore-Langton (b. 1954)
 Robert Lancelot Gore-Langton (1885–1948)
 Montagu Grenville Gore-Langton (1919–1968)
 (7) Dr. Robert Edward Gore-Langton (b. 1950)
 (8) Jonathan Kent Gore-Langton (b. 1990)
 Lt-Cdr. Richard Gerald Gore-Langton (1892–1978)
 (9) Richard Eric Bevan Gore-Langton (b. 1933)
 (10) Richard Thomas Gore-Langton (b. 1959)
 (11) Gerald Hugh Gore-Langton (b. 1947)
 (12) Norman Guy Gore-Langton (b. 1950)

See also
Duke of Buckingham and Chandos
Baron Grenville
Viscount Cobham
Lady Kinloss
Earl of Arran (Ireland) (1762 creation)
Baron Annaly (1766 and 1789 creations)
Baron Harlech

References

Kidd, Charles, Williamson, David (editors). Debrett's Peerage and Baronetage (1990 edition). New York: St Martin's Press, 1990.

External links

Earldoms in the Peerage of the United Kingdom
Earl
Earl
Peerages created with special remainders
1822 establishments in the United Kingdom
Noble titles created in 1822
Noble titles created for UK MPs